Frances Evelyn "Fanny" Boscawen (née Glanville) (23 July 1719 – 26 February 1805) was an English literary hostess, correspondent and member of the Blue Stockings Society. She was born Frances Evelyn Glanville on 23 July 1719 at St Clere, Kemsing, Kent. In 1742 she married Edward Boscawen (1711–1761). When his navy work took him away from home, his wife would send him passages from her journal, some of which were later published.

Family
Their children were:
Edward Hugh Boscawen (13 September 1744 – 1774)
Frances Boscawen (7 March 1746 – 14 July 1801); she married 5 July 1773, aged 27, Admiral Hon. John Leveson-Gower (11 July 1740 - 28 August 1792), younger son of John Leveson-Gower, 1st Earl Gower and half-brother of the 1st Marquess of Stafford; they had five sons and two daughters. The heirs-male descending from this marriage are in remainder to the earldom of Gower and the baronetcy only.
Elizabeth later Duchess of Beaufort (28 May 1747 Falmouth, Cornwall – 15 June 1828 Stoke Gifford, Gloucestershire); she married on 2 January 1766 the Duke of Beaufort at St George's Church, Hanover Square, London. and had eight sons and four daughters by him. She may have been the "Lady in Blue" painted by Thomas Gainsborough.
William Glanville Boscawen (11 August 1749 – 21 April 1769), died aged 19.
George, born 6 May 1758, succeeded his uncle as third Viscount Falmouth in 1782. All the future Viscounts Falmouth and two earls Falmouth are descended from his two sons.

After Boscawen's death in 1761, Frances returned to her London house at 14 South Audley St, where she became an important hostess of Bluestocking meetings. Her guests included Elizabeth Montagu, Dr Johnson, James Boswell, Joshua Reynolds, Frances Reynolds, Elizabeth Carter, and later Hannah More, who described her as "sage" in her 1782 poem The Bas Bleu, or, Conversation, published in 1784. Her widowhood inspired Edward Young's 1761 poem Resignation. She "was widely known in literary London as a model letter-writer and conversationalist, prized for her wit, elegance, and warm heart," according to a present-day scholar.

Frances died at home in London on 26 February 1805 and is buried at St Michael Penkevil church in Truro.

References

External links 
Fanny Boscawen and her legacy at Hatchlands Park

1719 births
1805 deaths
18th-century English memoirists
18th-century English women writers
British salon-holders
English diarists
People from Kemsing
Women diarists
British women memoirists
18th-century diarists